Aquilegia nigricans, the Bulgarian columbine, is a species of columbine that is found in the mountainous regions of Austria, Slovenia, the Balkans, Greece, Italy and Ukraine. It is a perennial flower found in meadows, woodlands and at high altitudes. It prefers sun or partial shade, and moist, well-drained soils.

References

nigricans